Crosby, Stills, Nash and Young, 1969 and 1970 concert tours were two separate tours that covered North America, and Europe, before the band broke up for the first time.

History

First tour 
The first tour starting in 1969 and finishing with three dates in Europe in January 1970, was the first Crosby, Stills, Nash & Young tour. The tour was notable for performing at many of the era's major festivals including their second ever gig, a one-hour show at the Woodstock Festival in the early morning of August 18, 1969, which was a baptism by fire for the group. The crowd of industry friends looking on from offstage was intimidating and prompted Stills to say, "This is the second time we've ever played in front of people, man. We're scared shitless." Their appearance at the festival and in the subsequent movie Woodstock, boosted the visibility of the quartet tremendously. Footage from two performances from the Big Sur Folk Festival (held on the grounds of the Esalen Institute on September 13–14, 1969) appears in the movie Celebration at Big Sur. They also appeared at the violence-plagued Altamont Free Concert on December 6, 1969, alongside Santana, Jefferson Airplane, The Flying Burrito Brothers and the headlining Rolling Stones. At the band's request, their performance was not included in the subsequent film Gimme Shelter (1970). During this tour they also appeared on the television show This Is Tom Jones, performing "You Don't Have To Cry" and with Tom Jones, "Long Time Gone". They also appeared on the television show The Music Scene performing "Down By The River".

After a break for christmas they finished this tour with three dates in Europe, attending the Royal Albert Hall, was a who's who of British rock musicians including Paul McCartney, Donovan and Led Zeppelin's Jimmy Page and Robert Plant.

During time off in the first tour and in between the two tours, the band recorded and released their second studio album and their first as the quartet with Neil Young on board, Déjà Vu.

Second tour 
The 1970 tour got of to a rocky start, in consultation with other band members, Stills fired Reeves from the group shortly before the beginning of their second American tour in April 1970 "because [he] suddenly decided he was an Apache witch doctor." He further opined that "[Reeves] freaked too much on the bass and no one could keep up because [he] did not play one rhythm the same… he could play bass imaginatively, but he has to be predictable as well," while "Greg also wanted to sing some of his songs on the CSN&Y show, which I thought was ludicrous, only because the songs weren't great. We'll sing any song if it's great, but not just because it happens to be written by our bass player." He was replaced by Calvin "Fuzzy" Samuels, a homeless Jamaican musician recently discovered by Stills at Island Records' London studios. Shortly thereafter, Taylor (who frequently clashed with Young over the band's tempos during the first tour and Déjà Vu sessions) was also dismissed when Young threatened to leave the group following the first performance of the tour at the Denver Coliseum on May 12, 1970. Notwithstanding these previous tensions, Taylor would later assert that his dismissal stemmed from a flirtation with Young's first wife (Topanga Canyon restaurateur Susan Acevedo) amid renewed conflict between Stills and Young in the aftermath of Reeves' firing. Shortly thereafter, drummer John Barbata (formerly of The Turtles) was hired for the remainder of the tour and associated recordings.

As the 23-show tour progressed, the tenuous nature of the partnership was strained by Stills' alcohol and cocaine abuse and perceived megalomania, culminating in an extended solo set not countenanced by the other band members at the Fillmore East when he was informed that Bob Dylan was in the audience. In this turbulent atmosphere, Crosby, Nash and Young decided to fire Stills during a two-night stint at Chicago's Auditorium Theatre in July 1970. Following his reinstatement, the tour ended as scheduled in Bloomington, Minnesota on July 9, 1970; however, the group broke up immediately thereafter. Concert recordings from dates at the Fillmore East, and The Forum in June 1970 and at the Auditorium Theater in July 1970 were assembled by Nash, and produced the 1971 double album 4 Way Street, which topped the charts during a 42-week stay. Although they would continue to collaborate in various and largely ephemeral permutations, the four members would not come back together in earnest until their 1974 reunion tour.

Personnel 
David Crosby — vocals, guitars
Stephen Stills — vocals, guitars, keyboards
Graham Nash — vocals, guitars, organ
Neil Young — vocals, guitars, keyboards
Greg Reeves — bass first tour
 Calvin "Fuzzy" Samuels – bass second tour
Dallas Taylor — drums first tour and May 12
Johnny Barbata — drums second tour except May 12

Tour setlist 
A typical set list for the first tour included the following, although there were substitutions, variations and order switches throughout the tour.

First tour 

 "Suite: Judy Blues Eyes" (Stills)
 "Blackbird" (Lennon/McCartney)
 "Guinevere" (Crosby)
 "Helplessly Hoping" (Stills)
 "Lady Of The Island" (Nash)
 "On The Way Home" (Young)
 "Black Queen" (Stills)
 "I've Loved Her So Long" (Young)
 "You Don't Have To Cry" (Stills)
 "Pre-Road Downs" (Nash)
 "Long Time Gone" (Crosby)
 "Bluebird Revisited" (Stills)
 "Sea Of Madness" (Young)
 "Wooden Ships" (Crosby, Stills, Kantner)
 "Down By The River" (Young)

Second tour 
A typical set list for the second included the following, although there were substitutions, variations and order switches throughout the tour. The tour always started off with an acoustic set, with "Suite Judy Blue" Eyes opening, then solo/duo sets from Crosby, Nash, Young, then Stills, the songs in the solo spots were continually changing. A ten-minute interval section was taken before the electric set began, opening with "Pre-Road Downs", and generally finishing with "Carry On". They would then return for "Woodstock" and/or an acoustic "Find The Cost Of Freedom" for the encore.
 "Suite: Judy Blues Eyes" (Stills)
 "Blackbird" (Lennon/McCartney)
 "On The Way Home" (Young)
 "Teach Your Children" (Nash)
 "Triad" (Crosby)
 "Guinevere" (Crosby)
 "Simple Man" (Nash)
 "Man In The Mirror" (Nash)
 "Tell Me Why" (Young)
 "Down By The River" (Young)
 "49 Bye-Byes/America's Children" (Stills)
 "Love The One You're With" (Stills)
 "Pre-Road Downs" (Nash)
 "Helplessly Hoping" (Stills)
 "Long Time Gone" (Crosby)
 "As I Come Of Age" (Stills)
 "Southern Man" (Young)
 "Ohio" (Young)
 "Carry On" (Stills)
 "Woodstock" (Joni Mitchell)
 "Find The Cost Of Freedom" (Stills)

First tour dates

Second tour dates

Extra dates 
These were extra dates, not part of the main tours, but before the 1974 reunion tour.

References 

Crosby, Stills, Nash & Young
1969 concert tours
1970 concert tours